Hawthorn House may refer to:

Hawthorn House (Mobile, Alabama)
Hawthorne House (Pine Apple, Alabama), listed on the National Register of Historic Places as Hawthorn House (misspelled)
Hawthorn Hill, Oakwood, Ohio
Hawthorn Hall, Wlimslow, Cheshire, England

See also
Hawthorne House (disambiguation)